Anne Grethe Jeppesen (born 1 November 1957) is a Norwegian sport shooter. She was born in Florø, and is married to Harald Stenvaag. She competed at the 1984 Summer Olympics in Los Angeles, where she placed fifth in the 50 metres small-bore rifle (three positions), and tied 11th in the 10 metre air rifle.

References

External links

1957 births
Living people
People from Flora, Norway
Norwegian female sport shooters
Olympic shooters of Norway
Shooters at the 1984 Summer Olympics
Sportspeople from Vestland
20th-century Norwegian women